Form & Function is the second album by British drum and bass artist Photek. It was released on 14 September 1998 on the Virgin Records sublabel Science Records in Europe and on Astralwerks in the US. The album is made up of older Photek tracks that were previously only available on 12" vinyl. The first six tracks of the album are remixes by Photek himself and other drum and bass artists, while the second six tracks are the original versions. The last track on this album (no. 12) contains samples of the so-called "Halt Tape", recorded at the occasion of the Rendlesham Forest incident.

Track listing 
 "The Seven Samurai" (Photek remix) 
 "the margin '98(doc scott remix) 
 "the lighening" (digital remix)
 "rings around saturn (peshay and decoder remix)
 "Resolution" (Photek remix)  – 6:39
 "UFO" (J Majik remix)  – 6:15
 "Knitevision"  – 6:40
 "Santiago"  – 6:09
 "The Seven Samurai"  – 6:51
 "Rings Around Saturn"  – 7:24
 "The Water Margin"  – 5:29
 "UFO"  – 6:16

References

External links 
 
 

Photek albums
1998 compilation albums
Astralwerks compilation albums